Alexandra Valetta-Ardisson (born 7 June 1976) is a French politician of La République En Marche! (LREM) who served as a member of the French National Assembly from 2017 to 2022, representing the department of Alpes-Maritimes.

Political career
In parliament, Valetta-Ardisson served as member of the Committee on National Defense and the Armed Forces. In addition to her committee assignments, she is part of the parliamentary friendship groups with Italy, Monaco and the United Arab Emirates.

In July 2019, Valetta-Ardisson voted in favour of the French ratification of the European Union’s Comprehensive Economic and Trade Agreement (CETA) with Canada.

She lost her seat in the second round of the 2022 French legislative election to Alexandra Masson from the National Rally.

See also
 2017 French legislative election

References

1976 births
Living people
Deputies of the 15th National Assembly of the French Fifth Republic
La République En Marche! politicians
21st-century French women politicians
Place of birth missing (living people)
Women members of the National Assembly (France)